Prince Imoro Andani (died 23 November 2020) was a Northern Regional Minister of Ghana. He resigned in 2002 following a violent conflict in Yendi.

In November 2019, Prince Andani was appointed by Ghana's president as Chairman of Ghana Integrated Iron & Steel Development Corporation, a new agency that is to see to the development of the West African Country's significant iron ore deposit.

Andani died in Accra on Monday, 23 November 2020 in Accra. He was survived by his wife Katumi Andani and four children.

References

Year of birth missing
2020 deaths
Ghanaian royalty
Government ministers of Ghana